The 2020 Citrus Bowl was a college football bowl game played on January 1, 2020, with kickoff at 1:00 p.m. EST on ABC. It was the 74th edition of the Citrus Bowl, and was one of the 2019–20 bowl games concluding the 2019 FBS football season. Sponsored by Vrbo, a vacation rental marketplace owned by the HomeAway division of Expedia, the game was officially known as the Vrbo Citrus Bowl.

Teams
The game featured the Michigan Wolverines from the Big Ten Conference and the Alabama Crimson Tide from the Southeastern Conference (SEC). This was the fifth meeting between the two programs; entering the game, the series was tied, 2–2. Most recently they met in the 2012 Cowboys Classic in Arlington, Texas, won by Alabama, 41–14.

Michigan Wolverines

Michigan entered the game with a 9–3 record (6–3 in conference), ranked 17th in the AP Poll. They finished in third place in the Big Ten's East Division. The Wolverines were 2–3 against ranked opponents, defeating Iowa and Notre Dame while losing to Wisconsin, Penn State, and Ohio State. This was Michigan's sixth Citrus Bowl appearance; they were 4–1 in prior appearances. This was Michigan's 48th bowl game appearance, the 11th-highest total all-time among FBS schools.

Alabama Crimson Tide

Alabama entered the game with a 10–2 record (6–2 in conference), tied for ninth in the AP Poll. They finished in second place in the SEC's West Division. The Crimson Tide were 1–2 against ranked opponents, defeating Texas A&M while losing to LSU and Auburn. This was Alabama's third Citrus Bowl appearance; they were 2–0 in prior appearances.

Game summary

Statistics

References

External links
 
 Game statistics at statbroadcast.com

Citrus Bowl
Citrus Bowl (game)
Alabama Crimson Tide football bowl games
Michigan Wolverines football bowl games
Citrus Bowl
Citrus Bowl